Gernec is a village in the Vlorë County in southern Albania. It was part of the former municipality of Vllahinë. At the 2015 local government reform, it became part of Selenicë.

References

Populated places in Selenicë
Villages in Vlorë County